Chronicon Paschale (the Paschal or Easter Chronicle), also called Chronicum Alexandrinum, Constantinopolitanum or Fasti Siculi, is the conventional name of a 7th-century Greek Christian  chronicle of the world. Its name comes from its system of chronology based on the Christian paschal cycle; its Greek author named it Epitome of the ages from Adam the first man to the 20th year of the reign of the most August Heraclius.

Structure
The 'Chronicon Paschale' follows earlier chronicles. For the years 600 to 627 the author writes as a contemporary historian—that is, through the last years of emperor Maurice, the reign of Phocas, and the first seventeen years of the reign of Heraclius.

Like many chroniclers, the author of this popular account relates anecdotes, physical descriptions of the chief personages (which at times are careful portraits), extraordinary events such as earthquakes and the appearance of comets, and links Church history with a supposed Biblical chronology. Sempronius Asellio points out the difference in the public appeal and style of composition which distinguished the chroniclers (Annales) from the historians (Historia) of the Eastern Roman Empire.

The 'Chronicon Paschale' is a huge compilation, attempting a chronological list of events from the creation of Adam. The principal manuscript, the 10th-century Codex Vaticanus graecus 1941, is damaged at the beginning and end and stops short at 627. The Chronicle proper is preceded by an introduction containing reflections on Christian chronology and on the calculation of the Paschal (Easter) cycle. The so-called 'Byzantine' or 'Roman' era (which continued in use in Greek Orthodox Christianity until the end of Turkish rule as the 'Julian calendar') was adopted in the 'Chronicon' as the foundation of chronology; accordingly the date of the creation is given as 21 March 5507 BC.

Authorship
The author identifies himself as a contemporary of the Emperor Heraclius (610–641), and was possibly a cleric attached to the suite of the Ecumenical Patriarch Sergius. The work was probably written during the last ten years of the reign of Heraclius.

The chief authorities used were: Sextus Julius Africanus; the Fasti consulares; the Chronicle and Church History of Eusebius; John Malalas; the Acta Martyrum; the treatise of Epiphanius, bishop of Constantia (the old Salamis) in Cyprus (fl. 4th century), on Weights and Measures.

Editions 
 Matthaeus Raderus (Munich, 1615): Chronicon Alexandrinum idemque astronomicum et ecclesiasticum (editio princeps, Greek text with Latin translation)
 L. Dindorf (1832) in Corpus Scriptorum Historiae Byzantinae, with du Cange's preface and commentary
 J. P. Migne, Patrologia graeca, vol. 92.

Bibliography 
 See also C. Wachsmuth, Einleitung in das Studien der alten Geschichte (1895)
 H. Gelzer, Sextus Julius Africanus und die byzantinische Chronographie, ii. I (1885)
 J. van der Hagen, Observationes in Heraclii imperatoris methodum paschalem (1736, but still considered indispensable)
 E. Schwarz in Pauly–Wissowa, Realencyclopädie, iii., Pt. 2 (1899)
 C. Krumbacher, Geschichte der byzantinischen Litteratur (1897).

Partial English translation
Chronicon Paschale 284–628 AD, translated by Michael Whitby and Mary Whitby (Liverpool: Liverpool University Press, 1989)

References

Sources

External links
The 1615 editio princeps by Raderus at Google Books
Chronicon Paschale (Olympiads 112–187)
1832 Dindorf edition at Google Books: Vol.1; Vol. 2.

Byzantine chronicles
7th-century history books
Byzantine literature